Emanuel Matías "Cachi" de Porras (born October 16, 1981) is a former Argentine footballer who played as a forward.

De Porras also played for Benevento in Italy and clubs in his native Argentina, such as Ferro Carril Oeste, Huracán, Flandria and Acassuso, as well as in Indonesia for PSIS Semarang and Persija Jakarta, Uruguay for Durazno, Malaysia for Negeri Sembilan and Colombia for Atlético Bucaramanga.

External links

1981 births
Living people
Argentine footballers
Argentine expatriate footballers
Ferro Carril Oeste footballers
Club Atlético Huracán footballers
Persija Jakarta players
PSIS Semarang players
Benevento Calcio players
Negeri Sembilan FA players
Atlético Bucaramanga footballers
Expatriate footballers in Indonesia
Expatriate footballers in Italy
Expatriate footballers in Uruguay
Expatriate footballers in Malaysia
Expatriate footballers in Colombia
Association football forwards
People from Neuquén Province